The 1999 Lipton Championships women's doubles was the women's doubles event of the fifteenth edition of the tennis tournament played at Miami, United States. It is the third WTA Tier I tournament of the year, and part of the US Spring tennis season. Martina Hingis and Jana Novotná were the defending champions and won in the final 0–6, 6–4, 7–6(7–1) against Mary Joe Fernández and Monica Seles.

Seeds
All sixteen seeded teams received byes into the second round.

Draw

Finals

Top half

Section 1

Section 2

Bottom half

Section 3

Section 4

Qualifying

Seeds

Qualifiers
 ''' Vanessa Menga /  Elena Wagner

Qualifying draw

External links
 1999 Lipton Championships Women's Doubles Draw

Women's Doubles
Lipton Championships - Women's Doubles